Idole is a village in Carmarthenshire. Within the village is the Ysgol Y Fro school for juniors.

References

Villages in Carmarthenshire